Razaq Deremi Abubakre  (born January 20, 1948)  is former vice-chancellor of Al-Hikmah University, Ilorin, Kwara State, Nigeria. He is former Vice-Chancellor and Federal Commissioner for the Public Complaints Commission between 2012 and 2018. He was also a former chairman, College of Education, Ila Orangun, Osun State and former Dean, Faculty of Arts, University of Ilorin. He did his PhD in Arabic literature at the School of Oriental and African Studies, the University of London from 1977 to 1980 on Commonwealth Scholarship and Fellowship Plan. He was National President of Muslim Students Society of Nigeria. He graduated with a first-class degree. He also served as professor of Arabic Language and Literature.

Books 

 The Piety of Learning: Islamic Studies in Honor of Stefan Reichmuth
 The Interplay of Arabic and Yoruba Cultures in South-Western Nigeria
 Linguistic and Non-linguistic Aspects of Qurʼān Translating to Yoruba

References 

Nigerian people
1948 births
Living people
Alumni of the University of London
Nigerian academics
Nigerian academic stubs